Diploschistis is a genus of moths of the family Crambidae. It contains only one species, Diploschistis stygiocrena, which is found in the Democratic Republic of Congo.

References

Crambinae
Taxa named by Edward Meyrick
Monotypic moth genera
Moths of Africa
Crambidae genera